This is a list of places on the Victorian Heritage Register in the Shire of East Gippsland in Victoria, Australia. The Victorian Heritage Register is maintained by the Heritage Council of Victoria.

The Victorian Heritage Register, as of 2021, lists the following thirty-four state-registered places within the Shire of East Gippsland:

References 

East Gippsland
+